Gedling Miners Welfare Football Club is a football club based in Gedling, Nottinghamshire, England.

History
The club was established 1919 as Gedling Colliery Welfare and immediately joined the Notts Alliance, going on to finish third in the 1919–20 season, also winning the League Cup with a 1–0 win over Sneinton. They were renamed Mapperley St Judes in 1930, before reforming as Gedling Colliery during World War II. Following the war, they won the league and Senior Cup in 1945–46. The 1950s saw the club dominate the league as they won three consecutive league titles between 1949–50 and 1951–52, before winning the league again in 1953–54 and 1955–56. In 1956 they hosted Bishop Auckland in the FA Amateur Cup, with the police limiting the attendance to 10,000. The club went on to win four consecutive titles between 1957–58 and 1960–61; the club's reserve team also won Division One in 1958–59.

After adopting their current name, Gedling finished bottom of Division One of the Notts Alliance in 1999–2000 and were relegated to Division Two. However, the following season saw them win the Division Two title, earning an immediate return to Division One. In 2002 the club switched to the Premier Division of the Central Midlands League. A fourth-place finish in their first season saw them promoted to the Supreme Division, where they remained until becoming founder members of the East Midlands Counties League in 2008. The club remained members of the league until it was disbanded at the end of the 2020–21 season, at which point they were transferred to Division One of the United Counties League.

Honours
Notts Alliance
Champions 1945–46, 1949–50, 1950–51, 1951–52, 1953–54, 1955–56, 1957–58, 1958–59, 1959–60, 1960–61
Division Two champions 2000–01
League Cup winners 1919–20
Senior Cup winners 1945–46

Records
Best FA Cup performance: Second qualifying round, 1949–50, 1954–55
Best FA Vase performance: First round, 2007–08, 2014–15

See also
Gedling Miners Welfare F.C. players

References

External links
Official website

 
Football clubs in England
Association football clubs established in 1919
1919 establishments in England
Gedling
Mining association football teams in England
Central Midlands Football League
East Midlands Counties Football League
United Counties League